The 2022 Census of Bangladesh was a detailed enumeration of the Bangladeshi population that will be the sixth national census in the country. It was scheduled to be held in June 2022, will be conducted by the Bangladesh Bureau of Statistics, and the reference day used for the census will be June 15, 2022. It was initially scheduled to be held in 2021 but was delayed due to complications caused by the COVID-19 pandemic and a lack of equipment.

Background
After the Independence of Bangladesh in 1971, censuses were held in the years 1974, 1981, 1991, 2001, and 2011. The last census taken in the country was the 2011 census, which recorded a total population of 144.0 Million (this figure, however, was estimated by the Bureau to have been an undercount, and the actual population was estimated to be 149.8 Million).

Plans were made to conduct the next census of Bangladesh in January 2021, with the master plan having been prepared in 2018. In October next year, ৳1,761 crore were earmarked for the project by the Executive Committee of the National Economic Council. However, due to the COVID-19 pandemic, the Bangladesh Bureau of Statistics (BBS) was unable to conduct the census, delaying the exercise to October 2021.

As the October 2021 deadline approached, the BBS still was not fully prepared to conduct the census, as the government refused to purchase 395,000 tablet computers which were meant to be used in the enumeration. The BBS had made changes to the 2018 master plan in June, shifting the method of the census from manual to digital, which was expected to reduce the cost of the operation by 11% to ৳1,575 crore. Complications regarding equipment continued until March 2022, when the government approved the purchase of the tablets. The next month, the BBS announced the new schedule for the census.

Design
The 2022 Census of Bangladesh will employ 370,000 enumerators and make use of The exercise will also be the country's first digital census, making use of GIS mapping, tablet computers, and a Computer-assisted personal interviewing system to record data. A post-census survey will be conducted in 350 selected sample areas in order to ascertain the accuracy of the operation. The process will last from 15 June 2022 to 21 June reference point of the census will be 15 June 2022 at midnight.

Demography
As per as 2022 census, Bangladesh have a population of 165,158,616 people, of which 81,712,824 are male, while 83,347,206 are female. As many as 113,063,587 of them live in rural areas and 52,009,072 live in Urban.

The population of Bangladesh is 165,158,616 as per 2022 census report, of which majority of 150,360,404 people (91.04 percent of Bangladeshis) follow Islam, Hinduism is followed by 13,130,109 people (7.95 percent of population) as second-largest religion, Buddhism being third followed by 1,007,467 people (0.61 percent of population), Christianity is followed by 495,475 (0.3 percent of the population) and tiny micro-scopic minority of 198,190 people (0.12 percent of population) follow other religions most being tribal and Animists.

Literacy 
The literacy rate in the country has increased by 22.89%, according to the latest census. The rate of literacy was 51.77% in 2011 and it is now 74.66% in 2022.

See also
1991 Census of Bangladesh
2001 Census of Bangladesh
2011 Census of Bangladesh
Demographics of Bangladesh

References

Demographics of Bangladesh
Censuses in Bangladesh
2022 censuses
2022 in Bangladesh